Rodrigo de Bastidas y Rodriguez de Romera (died 1570) was a Roman Catholic prelate who served as the second Bishop of Puerto Rico (1541–1567)  and the first Bishop of Coro (1531–1532).

Biography
Rodrigo de Bastidas y Rodriguez de Romera was born in Santo Domingo. 
On June 21, 1531, and confirmed by Pope Clement VII as the first Bishop of Coro.
On June 30, 1532, he was consecrated bishop by Francisco Mendoza, Bishop of Zamora. 
On July 6, 1541, he was appointed by Pope Paul III as the second Bishop of Puerto Rico. 
On May 6, 1567, he resigned as Bishop of Puerto Rico. 
He died in 1570.

He was the principal consecrator of Alfonso de Fuenmayor, the fifth Bishop of Santo Domingo.

References

External links and additional sources
 (for Chronology of Bishops) 
 (for Chronology of Bishops) 
 (for Chronology of Bishops) 
 (for Chronology of Bishops) 

1570 deaths
Bishops appointed by Pope Clement VII
Bishops appointed by Pope Paul III
16th-century Roman Catholic bishops in Puerto Rico
16th-century Roman Catholic bishops in Venezuela
Roman Catholic bishops of Coro